Young Muslims was an Islamist organisation that was established in 1941 in the Kingdom of Yugoslavia, and was active during World War II in the Independent State of Croatia and after the war in the Socialist Federal Republic of Yugoslavia. The organisation disappeared after its leadership was arrested by the communist authorities in 1949. Although ideologically pan-Islamist, Young Muslims had a strong nationalistic component, advocating autonomy of a Muslim-dominated Bosnia and Herzegovina.

History

World War II 

At the end of 1930s, educated Muslim youth established religious organisations Trezvenost in Sarajevo and Ihvan in Mostar. As the organisations politicised they came close together to be united into the Young Muslims organisation. They also established a branch in Zagreb. Young Muslims resembled other Islamist movements of the time, both sociologically and ideologically. It was characterised by its opposition to reformism.

Given that the Young Muslims was founded just before the collapse of the Kingdom of Yugoslavia and that shortly after Bosnia and Herzegovina became part of the newly established Independent State of Croatia, an Axis puppet state led by the Ustaše, Young Muslims tried to offer pan-Islamism as a response to an identity crisis of Bosnian Muslims.

Due to shared opposition to reforms, Young Muslims have closely linked to the El-Hidaje association. In order to avoid being abolished or merged into an Ustaše organisation, Young Muslims transformed into the youth branch of El-Hidaje. With time, Young Muslims expanded their network and managed to cover most of the towns in Bosnia and Herzegovina.

Young Muslims engaged in two types of activities. On the one hand, within El-Hidaje they organised religious activities, including meetings, congregational prayers, and mevluds (although the latter were considered a Sufi deviation). On the other hand, they participated in the charitable organisation Merhamet and took care of Muslim refugees from eastern Bosnia and Herzegovina.

Ustaše led the policy of croatisation of Bosnian Muslims who were portrayed as the "Croats of Muslim faith", a policy supported by the leadership of the Yugoslav Muslim Organization led by Džafer Kulenović. At the same time, Bosnian Muslims were victims of the Chetnik massacres, which were also partly a reaction to the repressive Ustaše policies against ethnic Serbs. Therefore, a part of Bosnian Muslims wanted to distance themselves from Ustaše, so several resolutions were adopted at the initiative of El-Hidaja condemning the Ustaše policies.

Young Muslims got involved in the dissemination of such resolutions and joined their demands for the autonomy of Bosnia and Herzegovina. With the support of the Mufti of Jerusalem Amin al-Husseini, their demands were presented to the German authorities in the form of a memorandum where they offered the support of Bosnian Muslims in exchange for autonomy under the direct patronage of the Third Reich. Although this initiative remained with no results, it led to the formation of the 13th Waffen-SS division Handschar, to which many Young Muslims joined. At the end of the war, however, majority of the division joined the Yugoslav Partisans of Josip Broz Tito.

Post-war 

The Yugoslav Partisans won the war and the Communist Party took over the new Yugoslavia. The communist authorities abolished El Hidaje, and Young Muslims afterward became a clandestine and completely autonomous organisation. They managed to re-establish themselves around the three founding groups in Sarajevo, Mostar and Zagreb. Later, Young Muslims managed to spread to around thirty small or bigger towns and many other villages in Bosnia and Herzegovina, as well outside it.

World War II and the official atheism of the new government led to further politicization and radicalization of Young Muslims. The brochure entitled "How will we fight?" outlined six basic post-war goals of the Young Muslims, among which was the establishment of Islamic society and milieu; the establishment of Islamic order; and liberation and the political and spiritual unification of the Islamic world into an immense state or union of states.

After the war, Bosnian Muslims found their interests threatened by the policies of the communist authorities. Namely, the communists attacked the privileges established by the Statute on Autonomy of 1909, adopted while Bosnia and Herzegovina was part of Austria-Hungary. In 1947, the communists nationalized waqfs (religious endowments) and Sharia courts were abolished. Also, the system of religious education was gradually abolished from 1947 to 1952. The law enacted on 28 September 1950 prohibited the veiling of women. Also, the Cold war intensified fears of an armed conflict in Bosnia and Herzegovina.

The branch of Young Muslims in Mostar, therefore, issued a proclamation in which they designate communism as the greatest enemy. The proclamation states that "the enemy is destroying everything Muslim, and others are planning our physical elimination, as they annihilated Muslims in Hungary, Lika, Sicily and Spain. At the same time, the proclamation calls for a fight against the new authorities. Young Muslims were critical of the JMO's pre-war strategy, the secular intelligentsia and the compromises with the communist authorities. They declared themselves an "organization of education and struggle" in what they called the "days of jihad". Unlike the group in Mostar, which to some extent managed to spread to the rural population and make preparations for armed struggle, the rest of the Young Muslims were very limited in their activities. Their activity was focused on the education of urban youth and their recruitment, the expansion of informal networks and cultural activities with the aim of re-Islamising society.

Although Young Muslims advocated in principle for a hypothetical pan-Islamic state, the work of the Young Muslims was concentrated on the overthrow and destruction of the existing state order in Bosnia and Herzegovina and the creation of an autonomous Bosnia and Herzegovina. Such action was more nationalist than pan-Islamist. This was also reflected in the attitude of Young Muslims towards the Muslim world. For example, their support for the creation of Pakistan as a state with a national identity that stems from a religious identity under the leadership of the nationalist Muslim League of Muhammad Ali Jinnah, notwithstanding the criticism the Muslim League received from the pan-Islamist Jamaat-e-Islami of Abul A'la Maududi.

The first arrests of Young Muslims occurred in March 946 in Sarajevo. Among the arrested were Nedžib Šaćirbegović, Alija Izetbegović and Ešref Čampara. Each received a heavy prison sentence. Another wave of arrests was carried out in 1947 and 1948 across Bosnia and Herzegovina. Nevertheless, the organisation continued to develop. However, with Tito–Stalin split, which was a result of the culmination of a conflict between the political leaderships of Yugoslavia and the Soviet Union, Young Muslims suffered greatly. The principal leaders of the organisation in Sarajevo, Mostar and Zagreb were arrested. Four of them – Hasan Biber, Halid Kajtaz, Omer Stupac and Nusret Fazlibegović – received death sentences after a trial that was held in August 1949 in Sarajevo. After losing its leadership, Young Muslims soon after disappeared.

Footnotes

References 

 

1941 establishments in Bosnia and Herzegovina
1949 disestablishments in Bosnia and Herzegovina
Bosnia and Herzegovina collaborators with Nazi Germany
Islamism in Bosnia and Herzegovina
Islamist groups
Islamic fundamentalism